A Reservation Against Cancellation (RAC) is a type of ticket that can be sold for travel on the Indian Railways. Although it ensures certainty of travel, it does not guarantee a berth. A berth will be allocated to the ticket who reserves an RAC ticket if passengers who already have a confirmed ticket do not board before the train departure or get their confirmed ticket cancelled.
A berth is split into 2 seats for 2 RAC ticket holders.

An RAC ticket holder is given an empty berth if:
 If there are any last minute cancellations.
 If any quota remains unsold.
 If any confirmed ticket holders are given a free upgrade according to seat availability in upper class.
 
If this happens the other RAC ticket holder can then convert the 2 seats into a berth.

Generally, RAC/WL tickets will have two numbers - RAC8/RAC2, WL20/WL15, WL12/RAC2, etc. The first number shows the status of the ticket at the time of booking. The second number after the slash (/) shows the current status of the ticket. So, RAC8/RAC2 means that when the ticket is purchased, it was the 8th such ticket under RAC category, which has moved 6 places after 6 cancellations. It can be assumed that it was the 8th ticket in the queue and is now the 2nd. So having a RAC ticket means that it is possible to travel without confirmed berth allocation.

References

External links
Indian Railways - Reservation rules

Indian Railways Services